Homalomitra is a genus of flies belonging to the family Lesser Dung flies.

Species
H. albuquerquei Mourgués-Schurter, 1987
H. antiqua Roháček & Marshall, 1998
H. ecitonis Borgmeier, 1931
H. antiqua Roháček & Marshall, 1998

References

Sphaeroceridae
Diptera of South America
Brachycera genera